Tommy Williams was a footballer who played as a wing half in the Football League for Tranmere Rovers.

References

Tranmere Rovers F.C. players
Southport F.C. players
Association football wing halves
English Football League players
1929 births
Bangor City F.C. players
1979 deaths
English footballers